The 2008–09 BYU Cougars men's basketball team represented Brigham Young University in the 2008–09 college basketball season. This was head coach Dave Rose's fourth season at BYU. The Cougars competed in the Mountain West Conference and played their home games at the Marriott Center.

Roster
Source

Schedule and results
Source
All times are Mountain

|-
!colspan=9| Exhibition

|-
!colspan=9| Regular Season

|-
!colspan=10| Mountain West Conference Tournament

|-
!colspan=10| NCAA Tournament

Rankings

*AP does not release post-NCAA Tournament rankings.

References

BYU Cougars men's basketball seasons
Byu
Byu
BYU
BYU